Tsarvishte is a village in Kocherinovo Municipality, Kyustendil Province, south-western Bulgaria. As of 2013 it has 64 inhabitants. It is situated in the northern section of the Vlahina mountain range close to the town of Boboshevo to the north-west.

Citations 

Villages in Kyustendil Province